Royal Cappellen Football Club is a Belgian football club from the town of Kapellen, near Antwerp. Cappellen has matricule number 43 and has yellow and red as main team colours. The club has a long history in the higher divisions of Belgian football. In the latter part of the 1960s the club dropped for a long time into the provincial leagues, however in the early 1990s it managed to climb back into Promotion. As of 2019–20 they are playing in the Belgian Second Amateur Division.

History
The club Cappellen Football Club was founded in 1906 by a few youngsters who were not able to play with Victoria FC, at that time the only team in town. Soon they got the club officially registered. For the first few years the team played in the provincial leagues, but when in 1926 the national level of football in Belgium was extended with a third division, Cappellen got auto-promoted and thus managed to play on a national level for the first time.

Cappellen was able to keep up with the pace and even managed to end in the top few several times, ultimately leading to the team attaining promotion into the second division at the end of the 1932 season. Again Cappellen seemed to have few trouble in scoring points and in the 1935–36 season they even ended in fourth position, just two points away from direct promotion into the highest division. However just before the second world war, Capellen got demoted into third division again.

After the war Cappellen managed to climb back into second division during the 1946 season, but they immediately dropped back into third that season. In 1952, the structure of the Belgian league was altered to lower the number of teams in the higher divisions and to introduce a fourth national level, Cappellen remained in the promotion-division, but this was now fourth instead of third national level. The club never managed to regain promotion into third level and eventually it even dropped into the provincial leagues again in 1958. From 1961 until 1967 the team spent a few seasons in the promotion division again, but then sunk deep into the provincial leagues for many years.

It was only in 1989 that Cappellen managed to re-enter at national level into the promotion division which was rapidly followed by yet another promotion in 1991 to the third division. Even there Cappellen showed some good results as they ended in second position for three years in a row. In 1995 however they finally managed to win the division and as such the team was promoted into the second division, exactly half a century after they last played at that level.

Since 2000, Cappellen is playing in the third division again, with varying results.

Current squad
Updates 24 October 2019

References

External links
 Official Website
 Fansite

Association football clubs established in 1906
Football clubs in Belgium
1906 establishments in Belgium
Organisations based in Belgium with royal patronage
R. Cappellen F.C.
R. Cappellen F.C.